Xenophon Cole "Xen" Scott (July 6, 1882 – April 21, 1924) was an American football player, coach of football, basketball, and baseball, and a sportswriter. He served as the head football coach at Western Reserve University in 1910, at the Case School of Applied Science from 1911 to 1913—both Western Reserve and Case are now part of Case Western Reserve University—and at the University of Alabama from 1919 to 1922, compiling a career college football record of 49–26–4.

Born in Pasadena, California in 1882, Scott moved to Cleveland, Ohio with his family when he was four. He played college football as an end and quarterback at Western Reserve, from which he graduated in 1905, and then professionally with the Massillon Tigers.

Prior to being hired as head football coach, Scott was a horse-racing writer in Cleveland. He also contributed material to the Spalding's Official Foot Ball Guide in 1907 and 1908. In 1907 he became an assistant coach at Western Reserve University in Cleveland, often attributed as a key reason for the success of the 1907 and 1908 Western Reserve teams. After the unexpected death of Western Reserve head coach William B. Seaman, Scott began his head coaching career at Western Reserve for the 1910 football season. 

In 1910, Scott was hired to be head coach at the Nebraska State Normal School in Peru, Nebraska, where he also coached baseball and basketball. He compiled a 29–9–3 (.744) record at Alabama. His first Tide team went 8–1 to set a school record for victories in a season; his second team did better, going 10–1 and finishing atop the standings of the Southern Intercollegiate Athletic Association.

Scott recruited Joe Sewell to Alabama and then sent him to the Cleveland Indians when Sewell's football days were over; Joe Sewell went to the Baseball Hall of Fame. Scott's Tide scored 110 points against Marion Institution in 1922, an Alabama football record which still stands today.

In 1922, Scott's Tide beat Penn, 9–7, a shocking upset at the time and one which heralded the arrival of Alabama as a national football power. However, Scott did not get to enjoy his success; a case of cancer of the mouth and tongue forced his resignation after the 1922 season and he died in 1924, in Cleveland, at age 41.

Head coaching record

Football

References

External links
 

1882 births
1924 deaths
American football ends
American football quarterbacks
American men's basketball coaches
Alabama Crimson Tide football coaches
Case Western Spartans football coaches
Case Western Spartans football players
Massillon Tigers players
Penn State Nittany Lions football coaches
Peru State Bobcats baseball coaches
Peru State Bobcats football coaches
Peru State Bobcats men's basketball coaches
Sportspeople from Cleveland
Sportspeople from Pasadena, California
Coaches of American football from Ohio
Players of American football from Cleveland
Basketball coaches from Ohio
Deaths from cancer in Ohio
Players of American football from Pasadena, California